A bronchopulmonary segment is a portion of lung supplied by a specific segmental bronchus and its vessels. These arteries branch from the pulmonary and bronchial arteries, and run together through the center of the segment. Veins and lymphatic vessels drain along the edges of the segment. The segments are separated from each other by layers of connective tissue that forms them into discrete anatomical and functional units. This separation means that a bronchopulmonary segment can be surgically removed without affecting the function of the others.

There are ten bronchopulmonary segments in the right lung: three in the superior lobe, two in the middle lobe, and five in the inferior lobe. Some of the segments may fuse in the left lung to form usually eight to nine segments (four to five in the upper lobe and four to five in the lower lobe. The delineation of the bronchopulmonary segments was made by Chevalier Jackson and John Franklin Huber at Temple University Hospital.

Right lung

 Superior lobe
 apical segment
 posterior segment
 anterior segment
 Middle lobe
 lateral segment
 medial segment
 Inferior lobe
 superior segment
 medial-basal segment
 anterior-basal segment
 lateral-basal segment
 posterior-basal segment

Left lung

 Superior lobe
 apico-posterior segment (merger of "apical" and "posterior")
 anterior segment
 Lingula of superior lobe
 inferior lingular segment
 superior lingular segment
 Inferior lobe
 superior segment
 anteromedial basal segment (merger of "anterior basal" and "medial basal")
 posterior basal segment
 lateral basal segment

Clinical significance
Usually the infection of the bronchopulmonary segment remains restricted to it, although tuberculosis and bronchogenic carcinoma may spread from one segment to another.
Visualising the interior of the bronchi through a bronchoscope passed through the mouth and trachea, procedure is called bronchoscopy.
The carina of the trachea is a hook shaped process projecting backward from the lower margin of lowest tracheal ring. It helps to divide the trachea into two primary bronchi. The right bronchus makes an angle of 25°, while the left one makes an angle of 45°.
 The carina is a sensitive area. When the patient is made to lie on her or his left side, secretions from the right bronchial tree flow toward the Carina due to the effect of gravity. This stimulates the cough reflex, and sputum is brought out. This is called postural drainage.
Paradoxical Respiration: during inspiration, the flail (abnormally mobile) segments of ribs are pulled inside the chest wall while during expiration the ribs are pushed out.
Tuberculosis of the lung is a common disease in certain parts of the world. A complete course of treatment must be taken under the guidance of a physician.
Bronchial Asthma is a common disease of the respiratory system. It occurs due to bronchospasm of smooth muscles in the wall of the bronchials).

References

External links
 Bronchopulmonary Segments in 3D by Pauley Chea, MD
  - "Pleural Cavities and Lungs: Bronchopulmonary segments"
 Illustration at uams.edu
 
 

Lung anatomy